Boguchany Airport  is a small airport in Russia located in Boguchany. It has a paved, minimal utilitarian layout.

Airlines and destinations

References
RussianAirFields.com

Airports built in the Soviet Union
Airports in Krasnoyarsk Krai